Boxing was one of the sports held at the 1979 Mediterranean Games.

Medalists

Medal table

References
1979 Mediterranean Games report at the International Committee of Mediterranean Games (CIJM) website
1979 Mediterranean Games boxing tournament at Amateur Boxing Results

Medi
Sports at the 1979 Mediterranean Games
1979